Brian S. Dempsey (born September 30, 1966, in Haverhill, Massachusetts) is an American politician who represented the 3rd Essex district in the Massachusetts House of Representatives from 1991 to 2017. At the time of his resignation in 2017, he was the Chairman of the House Ways and Means Committee.

Prior to serving in the House, Dempsey was a member of the Haverhill City Council from 1988 to 1991.

References

1966 births
Democratic Party members of the Massachusetts House of Representatives
Norwich University alumni
University of Massachusetts Lowell alumni
Politicians from Haverhill, Massachusetts
Living people
21st-century American politicians
Massachusetts city council members